Matthew Gonsalves (born 9 October 1978) is an Indian football player who currently plays as a right back for Dempo.

Career
Mathew was a raw talent when Sporting Clube de Goa president Peter Vaz scouted him from Mormugao Port Trust (MPT) football team, and since then the defender has transformed himself and is currently enjoying with the Sporting Clube de Goa.

His journey began early in his schooling days where he represented his village school Our Lady of Remedios High School, Nerul. Idolising Spanish Gerard Pique, Mathew’s passion won him a place in Goa’s Santosh Trophy squad in 2008. Mathew was also part of the India team at the Special Olympics Asia Pacific.

References

External links
http://goal.com/en-india/people/india/26165/matthew-gonsalves

1978 births
Living people
Indian footballers
Sporting Clube de Goa players
Pune FC players
I-League players
Footballers from Goa
Association football fullbacks
People from Mormugao